Coleman Roberts Griffith (May 22, 1893 – February 7, 1966) was an American sport psychologist. Born in Iowa, he is considered the founder of American sport psychology. Griffith studied at Greenville College until 1915, and then studied psychology at the University of Illinois. While at the University of Illinois, Griffith established what he claimed to be the first sports psychology laboratory in the United States. At this time Griffith worked closely with the University of Illinois football team, studying how factors such as psychomotor skills and personality variables related to performance and learning of athletic skills. Due to financial reasons, the Research in Athletics Laboratory eventually was closed, which led to Griffith becoming a sport psychologist with the Chicago Cubs baseball team. Throughout his time with the Chicago Cubs, Griffith examined the players and completed a series of reports for Philip K. Wrigley, the owner of the Chicago Cubs team, with the results eventually summarized in a large report. His ideas were met with resistance, but he helped the Cubs to be successful while there. Griffith ended his career in the department of education at the University of Illinois until his retirement in 1961. Some of Griffith's main contributions to the field of sports psychology came from his publications The Psychology of Coaching (1926) and The Psychology of Athletics (1928). These publications were written during Griffith's time at the University of Illinois and covered topics such as how a coach must have knowledge in athletics, physiology, and psychology to be successful. Much of Griffith's research and publications have become the foundation for the widely growing field of sports psychology and many of his ideas are still used today.

Early life and education
Born in 1893, in Guthrie Center, Iowa, Coleman Griffith was the first of four children. He completed his undergraduate degree at Greenville University in Illinois in 1915, where he met his future wife, Mary Louise Coleman. While at Greenville College, Coleman was freshman class president, a member of male quartet, a member of the baseball and basketball teams, an organizer for various gymnastics events. Coleman received his PhD in psychology in 1920 at the University of Illinois under the supervision of Madison Bentley. His dissertation focused on the vestibular system of the white rat.

Career
In 1922, he was then appointed to assistant professor, and made acting head of the University of Illinois psychology department during Bentley's sabbatical. He offered an introduction to psychology course with a focus on the interests of an athlete. This led him to offering a course titled "Psychology and Athletics" for the first time in 1923, eventually leading to his first published textbook of General Introduction to Psychology. In 1927, after receiving a Guggenheim Fellowship, Coleman studied at the University of Berlin. Coleman was later named head of the Bureau of Institutional Research. This was an office that collated internal data for the University President, such as student-teacher ratios. He held this position until 1944 and was then named provost of the University of Illinois. He ended his position of provost in 1953, and in 1956 he was named head of the National Education Association's Office of Statistical Information. He retired from the department of education at Illinois in 1962 and worked for the Oregon State System of Higher Education thereafter.

Research

University of Illinois

Athletic Research Laboratory
In 1918 Griffith began informally investigating psychological factors related to basketball and football by observing the teams at the University of Illinois. He tested football players’ reaction times with a Sanborn reaction-time apparatus in 1920. After seeing these studies, the Director of Athletics at the university, George Huff, helped convince the university to open an Athletic Research Laboratory. In 1925 Griffith was appointed director of the newly opened Athletic Research Laboratory. The lab had two rooms, one psychological lab and one physiological lab. It also had a workshop and a rat colony. In the lab Griffith investigated psychomotor skills, learning, personality, and how rotation affected equilibrium. To study these things, he developed tests to measure reaction time, muscular tension and relaxation, coordination, learning, and mental alertness. He also interviewed athletes and designed precise interview questions to learn more about these athletes' experiences during competition. The Athletic Research Laboratory was closed in 1932 due to a lack of financial support.

Professional sports team

Chicago Cubs
In 1937 the owner of the Chicago Cubs, Philip K. Wrigley, offered Griffith a position with the team. This offer included a budget for equipment, and a laboratory in Chicago. Wrigley believed that Griffith could help the team by giving them a psychological advantage.

Initially, Griffith was met with resistance from manager Charlie Grimm, who did not believe in psychologists and told the players not to listen to Griffith. Over the course of the 1938 season, Griffith produced dozens of short reports for Wrigley in which he made a variety of suggestions for making practice drills more similar to actual game play. For instance, he suggested that batting practice be based upon full at-bats so that hitters could gained experience changing strategy with different ball-strike counts. In general, he wanted players to approach practice in the same frame of mind that they have during a game. These suggestions were not implemented.
Grimm suffered a "mental breakdown" of some kind during the 1938 season and resigned as manager. He was replaced by the (future Hall-of-Fame) catcher, Gabby Hartnett, whose late-season heroics, hitting the famed "Homer in the Gloamin'" against the rival Pittsburgh Pirates, led the Cubs to a World Series berth against the New York Yankees.

Hartnett, however, proved to be a baseball traditionalist, and was no more open to Griffith's ideas than Grimm had been. At the end of the 1938 season, Griffith wrote a 183-page report for Wrigley, in which he described Hartnett as being "unable to learn." The team's success under Hartnett's leadership that year, though, made it impossible for Wrigley to fire him, even if he had wanted to.

Griffith worked part-time during 1939, but only wrote four short reports and continued dealing with distrust from management. Only one report was written for the team in 1940 before Griffith's work with the team was stopped.

Major texts and publications

1. The Psychology of Coaching (1926)
Some of Griffith's main contributions to the field of sports psychology came from his publications The Psychology of Coaching (1926) and Psychology and Athletics (1928). His first book, The Psychology of Coaching, was written with the main theme being that a coach must have the qualities of an athlete, physiologist, and psychologist. All chapters were written to be directly relevant to coaches. In this publication Griffith focuses on topics such as the importance of habit formation, and "Morale", which is what he described as an ideal psychological environment where athletes can adopt and grow personal and intellectual traits in relation to athletics. According to Griffith, Morale is the ultimate aim of athletic competition and results in successful "personality and willpower"  Griffith built on his writings in the field of sports psychology through the Psychology of Athletics (1928).

2. Psychology and Athletics (1928) and The Athletic Journal
Griffith built on his writings in the field of sports psychology through Psychology and Athletics (1928) as well as many contributions to a journal called The Athletic Journal. Griffith wrote about the basic problems and psychological components of athletic performance such as skills, learning, habit, attention, vision, emotion, and reaction time.  The Athletic Journal, a periodical founded by John L. Griffith (no relation), was aimed towards writing psychology for coaches.  Griffith's contribution to this journal was the foundation of Psychology and Athletics.  Griffith's Psychology of Coaching, Psychology and Athletics, and contributions to The Athletic Journal were written during his time researching at the University of Illinois.

Later life
Griffith's professional work in athletics came to an end after the Cubs' season in 1940. Four years later, he became the provost of the University of Illinois; however, this position ended over a conflict with Illinois' professor of physiology, Andrew Ivy. The disagreement stemmed from Ivy's claim to have discovered a cure for cancer called "krebiozen". This conflict caused Griffith to resign by force, although he continued to work in the Department of Education until 1961. After retiring from this position Griffith moved and took a new position in the Oregon State System of Higher Education until he died in 1966.

Bibliography
 1922: An historical survey of vestibular equilibration, University of Illinois Press
 1923: General introduction to psychology, MacMillan
 1926: The Psychology of Coaching, Scribner's
 1928: The Psychology of Athletics, Scribner's
 1928: General Introduction to Psychology (revised edition), MacMillan
 1934: An Introduction to Applied Psychology, MacMillan
 1935: Introduction to Educational Psychology, Farrar & Rinehart
 1939: Psychology Applied to Teaching and Learning, Farrar & Rinehart
 1943: Principles of Systematic Psychology, University of Illinois Press

References

1893 births
1966 deaths
20th-century American psychologists
People from Guthrie Center, Iowa
Place of death missing
Lamarckism